This is a list of people who have walked across the United States from the east coast to the west coast or vice versa. Walking or running across the United States has long been pursued as a way to bring publicity to social causes.

Max & Zac Prizant 

Max and Zac Prizant, 24-year-old identical twins, became the first twins to run across the country upon completion of their 3,000-mile journey from the Golden Gate Bridge to the Brooklyn Bridge to raise money for Covid-19 relief. They started their journey May 21, 2020. The twins crossed the Brooklyn Bridge on New Years Eve of 2020, raising $15,000 for Heart to Heart International's Covid-19 Relief Fund in the process. They conquered myriad obstacles, including: ten charging wild stallions in Dixie Valley, NV; week-long stretches of triple- and single-digit temperatures in Stockton, CA; 800 miles of oncoming traffic along I-80 West, and the incineration of their support vehicle in York, NE  (after finding a replacement, the twins completed the last five hundred miles of the journey from Youngstown, OH to Brooklyn, NY by traveling 30+ miles per day from hotel to hotel .) Max and Zac averaged over 26.2 miles on days traveled, covering 62.1 miles (100km) on their highest volume day through Wyoming's Red Desert. The twins made headlines in Potter, NE and NBC New York. They tracked their journey on Strava

Isaiah Glen Shields 

Isaiah Glen Shields began walking from his home in Provo, Utah on May 13th, 2021. From there he walked to the western-most point of the continental United States, reaching the Pacific Ocean at Cape Alava, in Washington States Olympic Peninsula on August 1st, 2021. From there he turned around to walk to the Eastern-most point of the continental United States at the West Quoddy Head light in Lubec, Maine. He reached the Atlantic Ocean in South Carolina.

Noah Coughlan 
In 2015, Noah Coughlan, 33, of Vacaville, California, became the third person to run across the United States three times, completing a 3,000 mile solo trek from New York City to San Diego in 127 days to raise awareness for rare diseases. He first crossed in 2011, running 2,500 miles from Ocean Beach in San Diego to Jacksonville, Fla., in 132 days on the Run for Research. His second journey covered 3,100 miles from Half Moon Bay, Calif., to Boston in 108 days on the 2013 Run Coast 2 Coast.

Bill Bucklew
Bill Bucklew departed Tybee Island, Georgia, at 8:30 AM, November 24, 2017, and arrived at Imperial beach, San Diego, on January 31, 2018, at 12:45 PM. Bucklew appears to have set the record for walking coast to coast (67 days). Bucklew has Parkinson's disease and walked an average of 1.5 marathons per day, every day without a break. Bucklew was real-time trackable throughout his walk via Google location sharing and had different people walking with him in each state. Bucklew raised over $120,000 for the Michael J. Fox foundation and is writing a book about the connections he made along the way.

Bradford Lyttle
Bradford Lyttle, an organizer with the Committee for Non-Violent Action, and several others walked from San Francisco to New York City, and then through parts of Europe to Moscow, Russia, from December 1960 until late 1961. The action was called the San Francisco to Moscow March for Peace. Several participants, including Lyttle, walked the entire distance.

Dale James Outhouse, Adele Kushner, Kevin James Shay
These participants of A Walk of the People – A Pilgrimage for Life walked across the United States in 1984 as part of the action that called for global nuclear disarmament and better relations between the U.S. and the then Soviet Union. The march started at Point Conception, Calif., and went through Texas and the Deep South to New York City. Several others, including Andy Rector, walked significant portions across the U.S. and continued in Europe to Moscow, Russia, in 1985.

Ed Fallon, Miriam Kashia, Mackenzie McDonald Wilkins, Jeffrey Czerwiec, Steve Martin
These were the five participants in the Great March for Climate Action who completed every step of the 3,100-mile walk from Los Angeles, California, to Washington, D.C. between March 1 and November 1, 2014. Halfway through the March, Steve Martin left the main body of marchers to walk solo to New York, arriving there on September 21 as an emissary from the Great March for Climate Action to the People's Climate March.

Mark Baumer
Mark Baumer walked across the USA during 81 days in 2010. While attempting a barefoot walk several years later, he was killed by an SUV in Florida.

Michael Ross & George Crawford
Michael Ross, 18, from Manchester, CT, walked from Danbury, CT to Huntington Beach, CA. This walk took 297 days and was in an effort to raise funds and awareness for the Livestrong Foundation. Over $13,000 was raised. Michael was accompanied by his childhood friend, George Crawford. Most days both Michael and George were welcomed into the homes of kind people who would make dinner and give them a place to sleep. They could not believe the amount of hospitality they received. The walk started April 2013 and ended February 2014.

Philip Cihiwsky
Phil Cihiwsky, 59, from Loveland, Colorado, walked from San Diego, California, to York Harbor, Maine, starting his walk on March 4 and completing it on October 4, 2013. He walked 3300 miles, crossing 15 states in 7 months while raising awareness about food insecurity issues among older adults for Meals On Wheels and encouraging the people he met along the way to support home-delivered meal programs in their own communities.

Elliott Lannen and Graeme Lithgow
Elliott Lannen and Graeme Jeffrey Lithgow walked from San Francisco, California, to St. Augustine, Florida, from 2013 to 2014. The party began with three members, but Julio Lopez abandoned the project after traversing the California coast.

Helga and Clara Estby
Helga Estby, a 36-year-old from Spokane, Washington, and her 18-year-old daughter Clara walked from Spokane to New York City in 1896, setting off on May 5, 1896, passing through 14 states along the way, and arriving at the latter on Christmas Eve. She did so in response to a $10,000 challenge from a sponsor given to any woman who would walk across the United States. She brought with her a compass, red-pepper spray, a revolver, and a curling iron. She wanted the money in order to save her family's  farm. She did not receive it.

Louis Michael Figueroa
In 1982, Louis Michael Figueroa, age 16, became the fastest and youngest person (according to some sources) to run across the United States, covering the route from New Brunswick, NJ to San Francisco in 60 days to fulfill a promise to a friend who was dying of bone cancer.

In 1996–1997 he walked from Bangor, ME to San Diego, CA for local AIDS networks in memory of his brother Jimmy, who died of the disease. The walk was plagued by delays due to Figueroa's battle with Acute Lymphocytic Leukemia.

In 2005, he began a walk around the United States for victims of child abuse.

Steve Fugate
Steve Fugate walked across the U.S. eight times spreading awareness on depression and suicide. A resident of Vero Beach, Florida Fugate also walked to raise awareness for the Florida panther. He began walking across the U.S. carrying a big sign that says "Love Life", after his son's suicide in 1999. In 2005 Fugate's daughter died of an accidental overdose. "Trail Therapy: The 34,000 mile journey" is a mini documentary on Fugate.

Aaron Huey & Cosmo
Aaron Huey, age 26, left Encinitas, California, on January 22, 2002, and arrived in New York City 3,349 miles and 154 days later on June 25. His only travel companion was his dog Cosmo. He did not carry a cell phone and had no support team. Huey covered the why and how in his 2010 Annenberg Foundation lecture, and Huey also wrote journals of his travels along the way.

Pete Kostelnick
In October 2016, Pete Kostelnick, age 29, set the world record for fastest run across America; he ran the 3,067 miles from San Francisco's City Hall to New York's City Hall in 42 days, 6 hours, 30 minutes.

Barbara Moore
Barbara Moore (1903–1977), a Russian-born health enthusiast, walked 3,387 miles from San Francisco to New York City in 85 days in 1960, departing on April 13 and arriving on July 6.

Richard H. Noble
From March 12, 2011, through June 9, 2012, Richard Noble, a gay rights activist, walked with a rainbow flag from San Francisco to Jacksonville Beach, Florida.

James Harry Pierce
James Harry Pierce, a writer, street performer, and tour guide began his walk across the United States on May 30, 2011, at the age of 41 just south of Seattle, Washington, arriving in Key West, Florida, where he settled on February 7, 2012. For a number of years he performed nightly on Duval Street dressed as Darth Vader playing the banjo. He since leads bicycle tours of Key West.

Peace Pilgrim
Peace Pilgrim, née Mildred Lisette Norman (July 18, 1908 – July 7, 1981), was an American pacifist, vegetarian, and peace activist. Starting on January 1, 1953, she walked across the United States for 28 years until her death in 1981. She had no organizational backing, carried no money, and would not even ask for food or shelter. When she began her pilgrimage she had taken a vow to "remain a wanderer until mankind has learned the way of peace, walking until given shelter and fasting until given food." At the time of her death, she was crossing the United States for the seventh time.

Granny D
Granny D (née Doris Haddock, January 24, 1910 – March 9, 2010) achieved international fame in February 2000 when, at age 90, she completed her walk across the U.S. to support campaign finance reform. A resident of Dublin, New Hampshire, Granny D started the walk January 1, 1999, shortly before her 89th birthday in Pasadena, California amid the Rose Parade festivities. Despite being hospitalized for pneumonia after walking across the Mojave Desert, Granny D completed her walk on Leap Day of the following year, more than 400 days later, having traversed over 3200 miles across nine states (California, Arizona, New Mexico, Texas, Arkansas, Tennessee, Kentucky, West Virginia, and Maryland). She had to travel much of the last 100 miles on cross-country skis due to a snowstorm that made walking impossible. She wrote about her walk in two books. The first was co-authored by Dorris Haddock (Granny D) and Dennis Burke, "Granny D: Walking Across America in my 90th Year."  She chronicled her expedition and reasons for undertaking it in an autobiography entitled "You're Never Too Old to Raise a Little Hell" published in 2003. The following year, at age 94, she ran as Democratic candidate against Judd Gregg in the New Hampshire senate race, but was soundly defeated. She died shortly after turning 100, on March 9, 2010.

Chad Sigmon
Chad Sigmon was 38 years old when he ran across America starting April 1, 2013, from Jacksonville, Florida, and ending August 1 in San Diego, California. He ran to help end mental health stigma. He averaged around 22 miles a day for a total of 2,650 miles.

Katie Visco
From March 29 through December 29, 2009, Pave Your Lane's founder, Katie Visco, ran across America, from Boston to San Diego to publicize this campaign, which empowers people to find their passions. At age 24, Visco became the second-youngest and 13th woman overall to run from coast to coast.

Bob Wieland
Bob Wieland is a Vietnam War veteran who lost his legs to a mortar mine in 1969. He "ran" across America on his hands, taking three years, eight months, and six days to travel from coast to coast and raise money for Vietnam war veterans.

Zachary Bonner
Zachary Bonner is a homeless youth advocate. He started a non profit when he was 6 years old called the Little Red Wagon Foundation. At age 8 after seeing a documentary on a woman named Peace Pilgrim he decided to walk from his home in Tampa, Florida to the state Capitol Tallahassee. The following year at age 9 he continued his walk to Atlanta, Georgia and that summer at age 11 he walked from Atlanta to Washington, D.C. He vowed to become the youngest to walk Coast to Coast and at age 12 completed that mission by walking from Jacksonville Beach to the Santa Monica Pier. During his walks he used media attention to raise awareness to homeless youth and highlighted many programs working to help these kids. The journey took Zach 7 months to complete.

Joe "Tiger" Patrick II
Joe "Tiger" Patrick II is a Peace Dale, Rhode Island, Army veteran. After volunteering at Ground Zero for three weeks he decided he wanted to do something to bring awareness to the men and women who died as a result of the events during the 9/11 attacks, and those who have died while serving in the military for the United States of America. He committed to walking for the cause. He completed a memorial walk in 2011 and on his second walk in 2013 he walked approximately 3,000 miles across the United States beginning in April 2013 in the City of Coronado, California and ending in Washington D.C. in October 2013. During this walk he carried a memorial panel that he created on canvas, which displayed the faces of over 6600 color images of U.S. service members, and weighed over 50 pounds. He also carried an American flag and a bat used by Boston Red Sox second baseman Dustin Pedroia.

Walter O. McGill III
Walter McGill, also known as Pastor "Chick" McGill, the "Freedom Walker" and the "Cross Country Flagman," a 69-year-old pastor of the Creation Seventh Day Adventist Church and Vietnam War era veteran, began to walk across the United States on April 23, 2014- at Kill Devil Hills, North Carolina. He completed his journey on April 29, 2015, at the Santa Monica Pier in Santa Monica, California after traveling a route of over 3,200 miles, and carrying the United States flag by hand the entire way, the first such documented case. On July 12, 2015, he was honored at Dodger Stadium for the completion of the walk prior to a baseball game between the Los Angeles Dodgers and the Milwaukee Brewers.

McGill's websites promoting the walk, walkingcoast2coast and walkthewalknow.com, indicate an extensive list of causes for which he made the journey, including: civil liberties, human rights, national integrity, the restoration of individual and corporate self-respect, support for traditional family values, liberty of conscience for all citizens, the defense of constitutional principles, the review and appreciation of American heritage, care for the poor and homeless, the promotion of natural health practices, employment of the Golden Rule in daily living, and a spiritual awakening for the healing of the country. Along the way he saluted passing motorists and pedestrians, received certificates of appreciation at the Inland Empire and San Gabriel Valley, and left non-sectarian 40-day prayer guides for city and county officials. He was provided with a police escort part of the way along his walk in Tennessee and Georgia, and was awarded a "Day of Recognition" in his home state of Tennessee by Governor Bill Haslam.

During the portion of the journey through Prescott, Arizona he dedicated ten miles of his walk to Kayla Mueller, who was captured by ISIS and killed earlier in 2015.

In his closing statements, McGill said, "To be the first veteran to carry Old Glory from sea to shining sea has been a great aspiration of mine, and I'm praying this flag will be enshrined at the Smithsonian Institute [sic]."

Arthur Hitchcock
Arthur Hitchcock is entary-editorial photographer who, at age 19, walked from Long Beach, California to Augusta, Maine between May 11 and November 2, 2011. Hitchcock walked to raise funds for breast cancer research and aid to assist families dealing with the cost of hospital bills and treatments. He walked to honor his deceased parents, Janet and Mike Hitchcock. His mother died from ductal carcinoma a few months before the trip. The majority of his route included major highways (it's illegal to walk on most major highways). He was led by a support vehicle.

John Ball
Retired U.S. Air Force Colonel John Ball, aka "The Walking Aggie," walked coast-to-coast across America from March 1, 2015 to August 17, 2015. Beginning at Scripps Park in La Jolla, California and ending at Daytona Beach, Florida, Ball, age 58, walked 2,686 miles, crossing 8 states in 170 days. His unassisted, uninterrupted walk raised over $27,000 to help establish an Endowed Aggie Ring Scholarship at his alma mater, Texas A&M University.  In 2019, John accomplished another long walk, this time across Europe, beginning in Athens, Greece and ending in Oslo, Norway. This trek took 151 
days and covered 2314 miles through 7 countries; Greece, Italy, Austria, Germany, Denmark, Sweden, and Norway.

Anthony Roddy
Anthony "Silverback" Roddy is a retired USDA Forest Service worker who, at age 56, walked from Wells Beach, Maine, to Imperial Beach, California, between April 19 and December 15, 2015. A US Army veteran of the war in Iraq, he crossed 13 states in 244 days, walking approximately 3,073 miles. His Walkabout-America 2015 was the culmination of a life-long dream, but moreover was an advocacy campaign to help grant wishes to children with life-threatening medical conditions. He raised more than $5,000 for the Make-a-Wish Foundation.

Jeffrey Grabosky
From January 20 to May 20, 2011, Jeff Grabosky ran solo and unsupported for over 3,700 miles from Oceanside, California to Smith Point, New York. He took prayer intentions from people all around the world and prayed a decade of the rosary for each of the approximate 3,500 intentions he received. His book, Running With God Across America was published in 2012.

Bjorn Suneson
In 2019, Bjorn Suneson, a Stockholm native, finished at age 71 his seventh unsupported run across the United States.

Mike Maczuzak
Mike Maczuzak, president of SmartShape Design, walked solo and unsupported from Coney Island to Santa Monica Pier, covering more than 3,600 miles in 125 days, and traveling through 15 states, from March to July 2016.

Jason P. Lester
Run Across America — Ran 3,550 miles in 72 days averaging 50 miles a day across the United States(4th Fastest athlete to run from San Francisco to New York (July 2013). The run raised money for the Waves for Water organization's Hurricane Relief Initiative

Ted G. Stone
Ted G. Stone was a Southern Baptist evangelist and recovering amphetamine addict who walked across the United States three times and was on his fourth trip when he died. He made the walks to raise awareness for his ministry to addicts and would drive up to 150 miles off of his walking route to speak to groups. His first trip, in 1996, was 3,650 miles from the Capitol steps in Washington, D.C., south to Jacksonville, Florida, and west to Los Angeles. His second trip, in 1998, was a 3,550-mile walk from San Francisco to Virginia Beach, Virginia. His third trip was in 2000 and he walked 1,700 miles from Nuevo Laredo, Tamaulipas, Mexico, to the Ambassador Bridge in Detroit leading into Canada. He died on his fourth trip in 2006 in Nashville, Tennessee. He was walking from Chicago to Pensacola, Florida, which would have covered 1,100 miles.

Benjamin T. Lee 
Benjamin Lee, an Australian, walked from San Francisco to Delaware Bay between May 18 and November 30, 2013. Lee began his walk with a partner but shortly after a month, his partner quit. He continued his walk solo and unsupported. He raised money for the charity Oxfam.

Yi-joo Kwon 
In 2010, Yijoo Kwon of Palisades Park, N.J., ran 95 days from Los Angeles to New York City to raise awareness of diabetes.

Stephan Foust 
Between January 28, 1979, and September 6, 1980, Stephan Foust walked 3506 miles across the United States. While en route, Foust, of Elkhart, Indiana, did a weekly remote call-in radio show for WSBT-AM in South Bend, Indiana. The 30-year-old Foust began his journey on the Atlantic Ocean beach at Nags Head, North Carolina, then passed through the states of North Carolina, Tennessee, Missouri, Arkansas, Oklahoma, Kansas, Colorado, Utah, Nevada, and California, before ending his walk on the Pacific Ocean beach of Point Reyes National Seashore.

The United Souls of Awareness 
The United Souls of Awareness, a creative production team from Los Angeles, embarked on a year-long walk from Venice Beach, California, to Manhattan, New York, from April 1, 2006, to April 1, 2007. The core members, Kevin Smith II, Kam Talbert, Jordon Cooper, and Jonathan White, with many other walkers joining along, did this over-4,000-mile walk to encourage self expression, inspire themselves and others and they trekked town to town, sharing ideas and information.  They ended the walk at a Full Moon Drum circle in New York City at Visionary Artist Alex and Allison Grey New York City Art Gallery COSM.

Shane Moore 
Shane Moore did a solo walk from Jacksonville Beach, Florida, to Ocean Beach, California, in order to raise awareness and money for homeless veterans. He began his walk on October 10, 2017, and officially completed his journey on May 12, 2018. During his journey, he did several TV, newspaper and radio interviews. In total, he walked between 2600 and 2700 miles.

Gary "Laz" Cantrell 
Gary Cantrell "Lazarus Lake" did a solo walk (LazCon) across America from Newport, RI to Newport, Oregon. The walk was a total of 3,365 miles and took him from May 10, 2018, to September 13, 2018. Laz is the co-creator of the race The Barkley Marathons. He updated a daily blog on his website.

Ben Walther 
Ben Walther beat cancer and walked across America between May and November 2017, from California to Delaware, then rode a bicycle back home from Florida to California using Interstates 10 and 8.

Barrett Keene 
Barrett Keene, a PhD student at Cornell University, walked from Miami to San Francisco (through Nashville, Denver, and Salt Lake City) in 2012 to raise awareness and support for orphaned and abandoned children. Specifically, Keene was sharing about opportunities to impact the lives of children through the Global Orphan Project. As Barrett was walking, he was also researching teachers who were transformational leaders for his dissertation.

Mike Posner

Mike Posner, internationally famous musician known for his hit pop songs like "Took a Pill in Ibiza", undertook the journey in May 2019. His cause was to honor his late friend Ronnie. He regularly updated his Facebook page throughout the journey and was bitten by a snake along the way. Because of the snake bite injury, he was delayed for nearly a month in Colorado. On October 18, 2019, Posner finished the walk and reached the Pacific Ocean.

William Shuttleworth
A 71-year old US Air Force veteran, William Shuttleworth, walked from his hometown of Newburyport, Massachusetts to San Diego, California from May 15, 2019  to September 1, 2019. Shuttleworth intended to raise awareness for veterans' issues, such as veteran suicide and homelessness. He raised over $58,000 for the Disabled American Veterans charity.

Noah Barnes and Robert Barnes
At age 11, Noah Barnes became the youngest person to walk across the United States when he and his father, Robert Barnes, walked some 4,240 miles from Key West, Florida, to Blaine, Washington, in 2017 to raise awareness and funds for diabetes research. Noah was diagnosed with Type 1 diabetes when he was 16 months old. His project raised about $30,000, and he set a Guinness World Record for the youngest person to walk across the U.S.

Erwin Erkfitz
47-year-old health food distributor Erwin Erkfitz walked from Los Angeles, California to New York City in 1958 for at the time was the record for a cross-country walk.  He traveled 3,000 miles for 67 days, promoting a shoe and attempting to set what would be the record.

Matty Gregg
41-year-old Matty Gregg ran from Apple Park in Cupertino, California, to Concord, New Hampshire, from November 6, 2018, to August 7, 2019. The run spanned a total of 275 days through 24 states. He totaled 5,425 miles, interviewing hundreds of people for his sequel to Alexis de Tocqueville's essays, Democracy In America. He also raised funds and awareness for Firefighter Cancer Support Network.

Hannah Bacon
27 year old Hannah Bacon left from San Clemente, California on November 21, 2020 and arrived at Virginia Beach on June 12, 2021. Raising money for Sunrise Movement, a youth-led organization dedicated to solving issues around climate change, she walked for 207 days logging 3,081 miles.

Luke Woolfolk
24-year-old artist Luke Woolfolk, an Iowa native, began his journey on April 1, 2018 at Cape Henlopen, Delaware, embarking upon the American Discovery Trail. Luke walked over 1,500 miles to reach Adair, Iowa on October 1, 2018, completing the first half of his journey. Luke then resumed his journey in Spring 2019, after waiting out the snow and acquiring a heavier-duty stroller. He reached his destination, San Diego, CA, on or around December 1, 2019, having walked over 3,000 miles.

David Green 
57-year-old David Green and his Brazilian stray dog Lucky left Jax Beach, FL on March 22, 2021, with the goal of raising awareness for adopted animals. After 14 days, on April 4, Green developed a grade 3 stress fracture on his right tibia and learned that Lucky had lymphoma. They returned to where they left off on June 2 with the stress fracture healing and Lucky in remission from chemo-therapy and resumed the journey towards Muir Beach, CA. Lucky succumbed to cancer 2,306 miles later, running almost every day 15–20 miles, and Green touched the Pacific on September 26, 3,340.59 miles later.  His route touched The Appalachian Trail, Trail of Tears, Santa Fe Trail, Mormon Trail, Pony Express Trail and Historic Route 66.  He blogged daily about the journey.

Kevin B. Fern 
In 2018, Kevin B. Fern, founder of Kevin's IV Pole, walked across the United States pushing his IV Pole to raise awareness and funding for Childhood Cancer. Kevin departed Manhattan Beach, California on 03/25/2018 and arrived in Carson Beach, South Boston on 11/09/2018. His walked covered 3,300 miles. Kevin had the opportunity along the way to meet cancer survivors like him and their families.

Emily Haag 
On May 1, 2022, 29-year-old Emily Haag began her run across the United States in Jacksonville Beach, FL. Her 2,500 mile run through seven states ended 85 days later in Santa Monica, CA on July 24, 2022. She ran to raise money and awareness for Students Run LA, a non-profit that provides mentorship and training to underserved middle and high school students in Greater Los Angeles.

See also

 Transcontinental walk
 List of people who have run across Australia
 List of people who have walked across Australia
 List of people who have walked across Canada
 Twenty-first-century fundraising walks in Tasmania

References

Further reading
 
 
 
 
 
 
 "Walking across America: The people who do it, at a glance". The Oregonian.

Walked across United States
Walked across United States
List, United States
List, United States
Lists of American sportspeople
Unit
Hiking in the United States